Huaiwen Xu (born 2 August 1975) is a German badminton player.  Born in Guiyang, Guizhou, China, she decided to play for Germany because the Chinese thought that she was too short to play professional world badminton.

Career
Xu was among the most successful of a number of Chinese-born female players who emigrated from their badminton-rich homeland, in part, for a better opportunity to play in the world's biggest events. Beginning in 2003 when she won a spate of middle tier open tournaments in Europe, Xu went on to become one of the more consistent performers on the international circuit. She was a women's singles bronze medalist twice at the BWF World Championships (2005 and 2006) and won European Championships in 2006 and 2008 over Mia Audina and Tine Rasmussen respectively in the finals. At the 2008 Beijing Olympics Xu was eliminated in a close quarterfinal match by China's Xie Xingfang, the world's number one ranked player.

Among Xu's more than twenty national and international singles titles are the Scottish (2003), Polish (2003), Dutch (2005), and Swiss (2006) Opens, the Copenhagen Masters (2007), and five consecutive (2004–2008) German National Championships. Notably, she earned all of these titles after turning 27, an age at which world level singles players often feel that their best years are behind them.

Xu retired from playing on the international circuit in 2009 and worked as a coach for two years at the Bellevue Badminton Club near Seattle, teaching the Junior National team of young badminton players hoping to succeed in professional badminton. In 2010, she was appointed as an International Olympic Committee athlete role model for the 2010 Summer Youth Olympics. From 2011 to 2012, she served the Dutch Badminton Association as their National Coach.

Personal life
Xu speaks fluent Chinese, German and English. She is married to Matthew Curtain, the CEO of British Weightlifting. The couple lives in the United Kingdom and has a daughter.

Achievements

World Championships 
Women's singles

European Championships 
Women's singles

BWF Grand Prix 
The BWF Grand Prix had two levels, the Grand Prix and Grand Prix Gold. It was a series of badminton tournaments sanctioned by the Badminton World Federation (BWF) and played between 2007 and 2017. The World Badminton Grand Prix was sanctioned by the International Badminton Federation from 1983 to 2006.

Women's singles

 BWF Grand Prix Gold tournament
 BWF & IBF Grand Prix tournament

International Challenge/Series 
Women's singles

Record against selected opponents 
Record against year-end Finals finalists, World Championships semi-finalists, and Olympic quarter-finalists.

References

External links
 
 BWF player profile

1975 births
Living people
Badminton players from Guizhou
People from Guiyang
Chinese female badminton players
German female badminton players
Chinese emigrants to Germany
Naturalized citizens of Germany
German sportspeople of Chinese descent
Olympic badminton players of Germany
Badminton players at the 2004 Summer Olympics
Badminton players at the 2008 Summer Olympics